The 1903–04 season was the first season in Bradford City A.F.C.'s history, having been founded on 29 May 1903 and then elected into the English Football League to replace Doncaster Rovers in the Second Division. They finished in 10th position in the league and reached the fourth qualifying round of the FA Cup.

Bradford City were formed following a series of meetings during the first half of 1903 and replaced the former rugby league club of Manningham, whose Valley Parade ground they used. The club had already signed six players before they were accepted into the league before the rest of the side were later signed by a five-man committee. The board directors appointed Robert Campbell as the club's first manager. Bradford City's first game ended in a 2–0 defeat at Grimsby Town and the first home game resulted in another loss to Gainsborough Trinity. Club captain Johnny McMillan finished the top goalscorer with 14 league and two FA Cup goals.

Background

Organised league football had been played in the West Riding of Yorkshire since 1894 in the West Yorkshire League, but no side from the county had played in the English Football League. So on 30 January 1903, Scotsman James Whyte, a sub-editor of the Bradford Observer, met with Football Association representative John Brunt at Valley Parade, the home of the city's rugby league side Manningham Football Club, to discuss establishing a Football League club within Bradford. In May, Manningham's committee decided to swap codes from rugby to association football and so the Football League decided to invite Bradford City to join their league in a bid to introduce association football to the West Riding, the main sport in which was rugby league. The League voted in favour of replacing Doncaster Rovers, who had finished the 1902–03 season in 16th position in the Second Division, with Bradford City even though Bradford had yet to play a single game.

Review

Pre-season
Even before Bradford City were guaranteed a place in the Football League, the club made its first acquisitions by signing Jack Forrest and Ben Prosser from Stoke on 1 May. These were followed by four more players joining the club; Sam Bright, George Robinson, Peter O'Rourke and Jimmy Millar. Despite not having enough players to field a full side, four club representatives travelled to London by the end of May for a league management committee meeting, when the club was elected into the Second Division. Money was raised to fund the club, including at least £2,000 from sponsors, a balance of £500 from Manningham FC and proceeds from a summer archery tournament. Bradford City also took over Manningham's Valley Parade ground for their home fixtures.

The four-strong party which visited London, as well as newly elected Alfred Ayrton made up five members of a 13-man sub-committee which controlled club affairs. The first five, who also included J. Brunt, J.E. Fattorini, A.J. Foxcroft and J.T. Whyte, were responsible for first team matters. On 20 June, the club directors appointed former Sunderland secretary-manager Robert Campbell as Bradford City's first manager from a shortlist of 30 applicants. Campbell's role was to coach the players, helped by trainer George Cutts. Ayrton, who had been president of Manningham FC, became the club's first chairman.

Bradford played no recorded pre-season friendlies. Instead, Campbell and Cutts, decided on the first selection for the opening game of the season with Grimsby Town by playing a series of Whites v Stripes games between professionals already signed by the club and amateur players. The first squad was signed at a cost of £917 10s 0d, with the players choosing Johnny McMillan as their own captain. Millar, a defender signed from Middlesbrough, was chosen as vice-captain.

September
Bradford City's first league game was at Blundell Park against Grimsby Town on 1 September 1903, on a sunny Tuesday evening in front of 10,000 fans. The pioneering team consisted of Arthur Seymour in goal, defenders Willie Wilson, Fred Halliday, George Robinson, Jimmy Millar and Thomas Farnall with Richard Guy, John Beckram, Jack Forrest, Johnny McMillan and John Graham in attack. Graham, Beckram and Guy all came close to giving City an opening day lead, but Grimsby scored through Archie Dunn. After City were reduced to ten men because of an injury to Guy, Fred Rouse doubled Grimsby's lead in the second half; Grimsby finished the victors 2–0. Four days later, City hosted their first home at Valley Parade against Gainsborough Trinity. The game attracted 11,000 spectators even though there was no covered accommodation for fans. Among the spectators was Bradford's Lord Mayor and Lady Mayoress. City lost 3–1 with Guy scoring the club's first ever league goal, but they also had a goal disallowed and missed a penalty. The Bradford Daily Argus reported that the goal was "greeted with a shout which awoke babies on the distant hillsides of Bolton and Eccleshill. The match highlights were shown in Bradford's St George's Hall later in the same evening.

Bradford won their first game in the league in their third game of the season, with a 2–0 victory against Burton United at Peel Croft. A week later, they won their first game at their Valley Parade home by defeating Bristol City 1–0. McMillan scored in each game, with Forrest also scoring against Burton. They finished the month with a 3–1 loss at Manchester United.

October
Bradford played only two league games during October. The first ended in a 5–2 defeat to Burslem Port Vale; the second – on 24 October – finished in a 3–1 victory to Bradford against fellow Yorkshire side Barnsley. Instead, City played their first games in the FA Cup in the club's history. The first qualifying round match and the club's debut in the competition was a 6–1 victory against Rockingham Colliery with six different City players on the scoresheet. City progressed through the following two qualifying rounds against Mirfield United and Worksop Town, with all three games being held at Valley Parade.

During October, City also hosted an inter-league game between the English and Irish Leagues at Valley Parade. Although the ground was not up to high standards, the Football League was keen to encourage football in Bradford. An estimated 20,000 supporters attended the match which finished with a 2–1 victory for the Football League. The club also made their first signing since the start of the season, bringing in forward Thomas Drain from Scottish side Maybole.

November and December
City went another two weeks before playing again when their FA Cup run came to an end with a 2–1 defeat at their fellow Second Division side Chesterfield in the fourth qualifying round. They returned to league action on 21 November against Bolton Wanderers, nearly a month since their win against Barnsley. Drain, who had scored on his debut against Barnsley, scored Bradford's first ever hat-trick, but the game finished in a 3–3 draw. A week later, Drain scored for the third successive league match but City lost 3–2 to Burnley.

Bradford played six games during December, with the first two ending in draws against Preston North End and Stockport County. On 19 December, City defeated Leicester Fosse 4–0 at Valley Parade. It was City's highest league victory of the season with McMillan scoring his side's second hat-trick of the campaign. City finished the month with three games in the space of four days. They first lost 4–1 to Woolwich Arsenal on Christmas Day, before a 1–0 victory at Blackpool. The year finished with a draw against Port Vale.

January, February and March
At the turn of the new year, City were defeated by Gainsborough Trinity, before they completed their first double by defeating Burton United 3–0. Two draws followed – against Bristol City and Manchester United. City extended their unbeaten run by winning all three matches during February, with victories against Glossop, Barnsley and Lincoln City. Each victory finished 2–1 with Beckram, Drain and Robinson all scoring twice during the month. The club's six-game unbeaten run came to an end in the return fixture at Glossop, with further defeats following against Stockport County and Chesterfield. The three-game losing streak was overturned with a 3–0 win over Burnley; Graham scored twice to become the third player to score more than one goal during a league game.

April
City packed in eight games during April to complete the league season. On 1 April, they lost to Lincoln City and then the following day they lost to Preston North End. A third game in four days finished in a 1–1 draw with Chesterfield. The first victory of the month came in the reverse fixture against the club's first ever league opponents Grimsby Town. City lost 1–0 to Bolton Wanderers before a 2–1 victory followed against Leicester Fosse, with McMillan scoring one of the goals. The final two matches both ended in defeats without City scoring; first to Arsenal, then to Blackpool. City finished 10th at the end of the first season recording 31 points from 34 games.

Team captain McMillan finished as the club's top scorer with 14 goals. He played 32 games, with goalkeeper Seymour, half-back Robinson and forward Graham all being ever-presents. With the advent of league football in Bradford, thousands of people came to home games, resulting in the club's end-of-season receipts totalling £3,896. It resulted in a small operating loss from the first season, but donations helped the club record a profit of £39 in their first season in the Football League. Following the end of the season, the club released six players and also sold Guy to Leeds City.

Match results

Legend

Football League Second Division

Source: Frost

FA Cup

Source:Frost

A.  All attendances are approximate.
B.  Attendance is unknown.

League table

Player details
Source: Frost

Transfers
Source: Frost

In

Out

See also
1903–04 in English football

References

Bibliography

Bradford City A.F.C. seasons
Bradford City A.F.C.